Port Sunlight Football Club was an English football club based in Port Sunlight, Metropolitan Borough of Wirral, Merseyside.

The club played in West Cheshire Football League in the 1890's winning the title in 1894–95. They played in The Combination for the 1904–05 and 1905–06 seasons before moving to the Lancashire Combination for a single season. After World War Two the club rejoined the West Cheshire Football League and were league champions a further four times and runners-up on five occasions.

Honours
West Cheshire Football League Division One
Champions (5): 1894–95, 1946–47, 1950–51, 1972–73, 1973–74
Runners-up (5): 1952–53, 1963–64, 1964–65, 1974–75, 1981–82

West Cheshire Football League Division Two
Champions (3): 1947–48 (reserves), 1951–52 (reserves), 1974–75 (reserves),

References

Defunct football clubs in Merseyside
West Cheshire Association Football League clubs
Lancashire Combination
Defunct football clubs in England